Benjamin Jacques-Maynes (born September 22, 1978) is an American former road bicycle racing cyclist, who competed professionally between 2002 and 2015 for the Sierra Nevada–Cannondale,  and  teams. His identical twin brother, Andy Jacques-Maynes, also competed professionally and was also part of the  team in 2011.

Career
In the 2009 Nevada City Classic in California, Jacques-Maynes took second, from a three-man break that included race-winner Lance Armstrong and Levi Leipheimer. Before an estimated 20,000 fans, the trio was able to lap the field on the very difficult short course.

In the spring of 2010, in what VeloNews called "the first major pro road race of the U.S. season", Jacques-Maynes won the Merco Credit Union Classic, a three-stage event in California. His  team won the team time trial, and he won the Merced Foothills Road Race.

Jacques-Maynes was the last of the four to be caught on the stage from Nevada City to Sacramento, just as he was entering downtown Sacramento for the finishing laps.

Jacques-Maynes entered every edition of the Tour of California from its inception, until 2015. In the 2007 Tour of California, he placed third in the prologue time trial.

Major results 

2004
 1st Nature Valley Grand Prix
2007
 1st Cascade Cycling Classic
 1st Mt. Hood Cycling Classic
 1st Exeter TT, Sequoia Cycling Classic
2008
 1st Exeter TT, Sequoia Cycling Classic
 1st Prologue Mt Hood Classic
 2nd Tour de Leelanau
2009
 1st Copperopolis Road Race
 2nd Nevada City Classic
 7th Overall Tour de San Luis
 7th Overall Tour of Missouri
 7th Overall Herald Sun Tour
2010
 1st Merced Credit Union Cycling Classic
2012
 1st Mountains classification Tour of Utah
 7th Tour of the Battenkill
2013
 7th Bucks County Classic
 9th Overall Tour of Elk Grove
2014
 1st  Mountains classification 2014 USA Pro Cycling Challenge
2015
 4th Overall Cascade Cycling Classic

References

External links 
 
 
 

1978 births
Living people
American male cyclists
Cyclists from California
People from Watsonville, California